Ernest Becker (April 27, 1925 – December 29, 2007) was a Canadian football player who played for the Saskatchewan Roughriders and Winnipeg Blue Bombers. He also played for the Montreal Alouettes, Toronto Balmy Beach Beachers and Toronto Argonauts in the 1940s.

References

1925 births
2007 deaths
Winnipeg Blue Bombers players
Canadian football running backs
Saskatchewan Roughriders players

Ernie Becker was also an accomplished diver and swimmer. In 1949 he broke the Junior Canadian Record for the 50 yard Free Style in 24.0 seconds flat. He also held the Senior 100 yard Freestyle in swimming and both the Junior and Senior diving titles. He was employed for 39 years as the swimming professional at the Winnipeg Winter Club.